Anita Bitri-Prapaniku (8 January 1968 – 19 October 2004) was a pop singer and violinist from Albania, popular in her native country. Bitri had her first music success at the age of sixteen, and she became popular in Albania with her song "First Love". She emigrated to the United States in 1996. 

She was found dead in her Staten Island home along with her 8-year-old daughter Sibora Nini and 60-year-old mother Azbije. The three died due to an accidental carbon monoxide poisoning after boiler ventilators in the basement were stuffed with plastic bags to keep out concrete from construction work. Her husband, Luan Prapaniku, had recently died from cancer.

At the time of her death, she was in the process of recording two albums, one in Albanian and one in English. She was also dating Parid Gjoka.

See also
Parashqevi Simaku

References

External links
NYT story
NY Daily News
Memorial Site

1968 births
2004 deaths
20th-century Albanian women singers
Deaths from carbon monoxide poisoning
Accidental deaths in New York (state)
Albanian emigrants to the United States
Albanian violinists
20th-century violinists
Festivali i Këngës winners